Finansbanken is a Danish bank that was founded on September 27, 1979, with the name "Den Københavnske Bank" (Bank of Copenhagen). The bank's name was later changed to "Finansbanken". It was later sold to Sparekassen Lolland and operates as a subsidiary. It is headquartered in Copenhagen, Denmark.

The bank's main area of competence is private banking, with customers worldwide in more than 85 countries.

References 

Banks of Denmark
Banks established in 1979
Companies based in Copenhagen
Danish companies established in 1979